The Capital Cup is a friendly association football tournament held in July hosted by Major League Soccer club D.C. United at their stadium Audi Field. It is contested by clubs from CONCACAF nations.

The inaugural tournament was held in 2021, but was only a two-legged aggregate series between two clubs, as two other teams withdrew due to the COVID-19 pandemic. The second edition featured three teams and utilized a round-robin format. D.C. United won both editions.

2021  
In the first year of the tournament, two of the four invitees—Alianza and Puebla—withdrew due to the COVID-19 pandemic.

2022 

<noinclude>

References 
 

 
American soccer friendly trophies
Soccer in Washington, D.C.
2021 establishments in Washington, D.C.
Recurring sporting events established in 2021